Melaleuca kunzeoides is a shrub in the myrtle family Myrtaceae and is endemic to central Queensland in Australia. It is a rare shrub with a very limited distribution and is classified as 'vulnerable' by the Australian Government.

Description

The flowers are yellowish green arranged on spikes on the ends of branches and between the leaves. Each spike contains 5 to 17 individual flowers, or sometimes flowers in pairs or threes. The stamens are arranged in five bundles around the flower, each bundle containing 4 to 6 stamens.

Taxonomy and naming
Melaleuca kunzeoides was first formally described by Byrnes in 1984 in Austrobaileya. The specific epithet (kunzeoides) refers to an apparent similarity of this species to one in the genus Kunzea.

Distribution and habitat
Melaleuca kunzeoides occurs near Adavale in central Queensland. The species occurs on private property.

Conservation status
This species has been classified as "vulnerable" by the Australian government. It is included in the IUCN Red Book of endangered plants.

References

kunzeoides
Flora of Queensland
Myrtales of Australia
Vulnerable flora of Australia
Plants described in 1984
Taxa named by Norman Brice Byrnes